Chairlift was an American synth-pop band. Caroline Polachek and Aaron Pfenning formed Chairlift in 2005 while living in Boulder, Colorado, and Patrick Wimberly joined them when they moved to Brooklyn in 2007. In 2008, Chairlift released their debut album Does You Inspire You. Pfenning left the band in 2010, and as a duo, Polachek and Wimberly released two more albums: 2012's Something and 2016's Moth before announcing the end of Chairlift in December 2016.

History
Chairlift formed initially as a project between Aaron Pfenning and Caroline Polachek at the University of Colorado in October 2005. The group intended to make background music for haunted houses. Along with bassist Kyle McCabe, Chairlift recorded the beginning of Daylight Savings EP at New Monkey Studio in Los Angeles, California, in April 2006.
Chairlift relocated to Williamsburg, Brooklyn, in August 2006 and signed to Kanine Records in June 2007. Patrick Wimberly joined the group in early 2007. After writing and recording while Polachek was still in college, Chairlift released their first full-length album, Does You Inspire You, in 2008. Their song "Bruises" was featured in the 2008 Apple commercial that launched the fourth-generation iPod Nano. The single "Evident Utensil" was nominated for an award in the "Breakthrough Video" category at the 2009 MTV Video Music Awards. The album was rereleased by Columbia Records on April 21, 2009, after the band signed with the major label. The re-release included two additional tracks not on the original release and a longer version of "Make Your Mind Up". Chairlift went on their first international tour, opening for bands like Phoenix, The Killers, and MGMT.

Pfenning left Chairlift in 2010 to pursue his solo career in Rewards.

On September 7, 2011, they released the video to their single "Amanaemonesia" from their second album Something. For their 2012 single "Met Before" Chairlift created an interactive, choose-your-own-adventure video that BuzzFeed awarded the number one spot on its "23 Best Music Videos of 2012" end-of-year round up. Their sophomore album Something released via Columbia Records on January 24, 2012. Something features production from Dan Carey and Alan Moulder. After the record was released in Japan, Polachek co-directed a video for a Japanese version of "I Belong In Your Arms" with director/animator Eric Epstein.

Through the time Polachek was finishing her solo record Arcadia, Chairlift continued working on their third record, Moth. Moth was released January 22, 2016 and featured 10 new songs, including the single "Ch-Ching".

In December 2016, Chairlift announced that they would be breaking up, with a final tour occurring in the spring of 2017. Polachek has since continued with her solo career.

Discography

Studio albums

EPs

Singles

Remixes
 Glasser – "Apply (Chairlift Remix)" (2012)
 Phoenix – "Fences (Chairlift Remix)" (2012)
 Indochine – "College Boy (Chairlift Remix)" (2013)

References

External links

 
 Video: Exclusive live video on Punkrockvids.com
 New band of the day: Chairlift in guardian.co.uk
 Video: Evident Utensil 
 June 2009 Interview with L.A. Record
 Interview with Aaron for Stereo Subversion (July 2009)
 Artist profile on Kanine Records site

Indie rock musical groups from Colorado
Indie rock musical groups from New York (state)
American synth-pop groups
American new wave musical groups
Art pop groups
Avant-pop musicians
Columbia Records artists
American contemporary R&B musical groups
Dream pop musical groups
Electronic music groups from Colorado
Electronic music groups from New York (state)
Electropop groups
Experimental pop groups
Indie pop groups from Colorado
Indie pop groups from New York (state)
Kanine Records artists
Musical groups disestablished in 2017
Musical groups established in 2005
Musical groups from Brooklyn